The 1993 IIHF Asian Oceanic Junior U18 Championship was the 10th edition of the IIHF Asian Oceanic Junior U18 Championship. It took place between 6 and 12 March 1993 in Seoul, South Korea. The tournament was won by Kazakhstan, who claimed their first title by finishing first in the standings. Japan and South Korea finished second and third respectively.

Standings

Fixtures
Reference

References

External links
International Ice Hockey Federation

IIHF Asian Oceanic U18 Championships
Asian
International ice hockey competitions hosted by South Korea